The Tumansky R-11 (initially AM-11) is a Soviet Cold War-era turbojet engine.

Design and development 
The Tumansky R-11 was developed by A.A. Mikulin, Sergei Tumansky, and B.S. Stechkin as a twin-spool axial-flow high-altitude non-afterburning turbojet for Yakovlev Yak-25RV reconnaissance aircraft. This engine was the first Soviet twin-spool turbojet. It was first run in early 1956 and was later employed in some variants of the Yakovlev Yak-26 and Yakovlev Yak-27, as well as the Yak-28. The R-11's basic design was very successful and it was later developed into the Tumansky R-13 and Tumansky R-25 along with the experimental Tumansky R-21. A total of 20,900 R-11 engines were built.

Variants 
 R-11V-300 - first production version, high-altitude, non-afterburning
 R-11F-300 (R-37F) - afterburning version, entered production in 1956, used on MiG-21F, P and U.
 R-11AF-300 - improved version for Yakovlev Yak-28B, L and U.
 R-11F2-300 - new compressor, afterburner and nozzle, used on MiG-21P, PF and FL.
 R-11AF2-300 - R-11F2-300 adapted for Yakovlev Yak-28I, R and P.
 R-11F2S-300 - upgraded version for MiG-21PFM, PFS, S, U and UM, and for Sukhoi Su-15, UT and UM.
 Shenyang WP-7, Chinese license built copies of the R-11and

Applications 
 Sukhoi Su-15
 Mikoyan-Gurevich MiG-21
 Yakovlev Yak-25
 Yakovlev Yak-26
 Yakovlev Yak-27
 Yakovlev Yak-28

Specifications (R-11F2S-300)

See also
List of aircraft engines

References

Citations

Sources 

 Gunston, Bill. World Encyclopedia of Aero Engines. Cambridge, England. Patrick Stephens Limited, 1989. .

External links

LeteckeMotory.cz - R-11  - 

Tumansky aircraft engines
1950s turbojet engines